The 2019 Internazionali di Tennis Emilia Romagna was a professional tennis tournament played on clay courts. It was the first edition of the tournament which was part of the 2019 ATP Challenger Tour. It took place in Parma, Italy between 17 and 23 June 2019.

Singles main-draw entrants

Seeds

 1 Rankings are as of 10 June 2019.

Other entrants
The following players received wildcards into the singles main draw:
  Gianluca Di Nicola
  Emiliano Maggioli
  Lorenzo Musetti
  Adelchi Virgili
  Giulio Zeppieri

The following player received entry into the singles main draw as an alternate:
  Fabrizio Ornago

The following players received entry into the singles main draw using their ITF World Tennis Ranking:
  Riccardo Bonadio
  Sandro Ehrat
  Tomás Martín Etcheverry
  Nerman Fatić
  Christopher Heyman

The following players received entry from the qualifying draw:
  Marco Bortolotti
  Francesco Forti

Champions

Singles

 Tommy Robredo def.  Federico Gaio 7–6(12–10), 5–7, 7–6(8–6).

Doubles

 Laurynas Grigelis /  Andrea Pellegrino def.  Ariel Behar /  Gonzalo Escobar 1–6, 6–3, [10–7].

References

2019 ATP Challenger Tour
2019 in Italian tennis
June 2019 sports events in Italy